Kendalia is an unincorporated community in northeastern Kendall County, Texas, United States. It is part of the Texas-German belt.

Geography
Kendalia lies at the intersection of RM 473 and FM 3351 northeast of the city of Boerne, the county seat of Kendall County. Although Kendalia is unincorporated, it has a post office, with the ZIP code of 78027; the ZCTA for ZIP Code 78027 had a population of 459 at the 2010 census. The community is part of the San Antonio Metropolitan Statistical Area.

History
Likely named for early nearby settler George Wilkins Kendall, the community was surveyed in 1883, although a post office was not established until 1895.  The local economy has long been dependent primarily on ranching, although many residents today work in cities such as Blanco or San Antonio.

Major highways
Ranch to Market Road 473
Farm to Market Road 3351

References

External links
Profile of Kendalia from the Handbook of Texas Online

Unincorporated communities in Kendall County, Texas
Unincorporated communities in Texas
Greater San Antonio